David Daoud is a Lebanese-born French painter. He lives and works in Paris and Beirut.

Biography 
David Daoud was born on January 4, 1970, in Beirut, Lebanon. Daoud and his family left Lebanon because of the Lebanese Civil War and moved to France in 1983. He attended the Beaux-Arts de Paris and after that enrolled at the École nationale supérieure des arts décoratifs and studied with Charles Auffret. In 2011, Daoud received the Frédéric de Carfort prize from the Fondation de France. He illustrated the cover of the album Levantine Symphony by Ibrahim Maalouf.

Exhibitions

Solo 

 2022: David Daoud - Peindre au soleil noir de la mélancolie, Galerie Cheriff Tabet, Beirut
 2022: David Daoud - Rêve d'absolu, Galerie de l'Europe, Paris
 2021: David Daoud - Invitation au voyage, Galerie Murmure, Colmar, Fr
 2020: Institut du Monde Arabe, Paris 
 2020: GALLERY DANIELLE BOURDETTE Gorzkowski, Honfleur, Germany
 2020: David Daoud - Horizon lointain, Liège, Belgium
 2019: David Daoud - De l'art pariétal à la création contemporaine, Museum of Lebanese Prehistory, Beirut
 2019: Jacques Prévert Theatre and Cinema, Mers-les-Bains, Fr
 2018:  David Daoud : Les Paysages éphémères - Les Empreintes, œuvres graphiques - Les Dialogues, Galerie Danielle Bourdette-Gorzkowski, Honfleur, Germany
 2018: David Daoud - Visions poétiques, 3rd arrondissement of Paris, Paris
 2018: Solo Atelier, Saint-Leu-la-Forêt, Fr
 2016: Le voyage de Daoud, Exode Gallery, Beirut

Group 

 2023: Les peintres de l'atelier, Maison de l'Etang, Louveciennes, Fr

References

External links 

 Official website

20th-century French painters
21st-century French painters
Lebanese painters
École nationale supérieure des arts décoratifs alumni
1970 births
Living people